Derzhavinsk (Derjavinsk) is a town located in the Akmola Region of Kazakhstan. It serves as the administrative center of Zharkain District. The European route E123 passes through the town. The town's population totals 6,307 as of 2020.

Demographics 
Population:

References

Populated places in Akmola Region